Narla (Sl. No.: 81) is a Vidhan Sabha constituency of Kalahandi district, Odisha.

This constituency includes Narla block, Karlamunda block, Madanpur-Rampur block and 9 Gram panchayats (Belkhandi, Hatikhoj, Kantesir, Kashurpada,
Nunmath, Paralsingha, Sirjapalli, Tundla and Turlakhman) of Kesinga block.

Elected members

Twelve elections were held between 1967 and 2014.
Elected members from the Narla constituency are:
2019: (81): Bhupinder Singh (BJD)
2014: (81): Dhaneswar Majhi (BJD)
2009: (81): Bhupinder Singh (Congress)
2004: (100): Balabhadra Majhi (BJD)
2000: (100): Balabhadra Majhi (BJD)
1995: (100): Balabhadra Majhi (Janata Dal)
1990: (100): Balabhadra Majhi (Janata Dal)
1985: (100): Kumarmani Sabar (Congress)
1980: (100): Tejraj Majhi (Congress-I)
1977: (100): Tejraj Majhi (Congress)
1974: (100): Anup Singh Deo (Swatantra Party)
1971: (94): Gangadhar Madi (Swatantra Party)
1967: (94): Anchal Majhi (Swatantra Party)

Election results

2019

2014
In 2014 election, Biju Janata Dal  candidate Dhaneswar Majhi defeated Indian National Congress candidate Jagannath Pattnayak by a margin of 15,768 votes.

2009
In 2009 election, Indian National Congress candidate Bhupinder Singh defeated Bharatiya Janata Party candidate Srikant Hota by a margin of 27,512 votes.

Notes

References

Assembly constituencies of Odisha
Kalahandi district